The Robinson River is a  tributary of the Rapidan River in Madison County, Virginia, in the United States. It flows southeast through White Oak Canyon and Berry Hollow, under Routes 231, 29 and 15. From its start in Shenandoah National Park as Cedar Run and Tims River, it has confluences with the Rose River, Quaker Run, Shotwell Run, Leathers Run, Mulatto Run, White Oak Run, Deep Run, Dark Run, Beaverdam Run and Great Run before its confluence with the Rapidan River. In the Syria area, both the Rose River and Robinson River are stocked with Rainbow trout and Brook trout by the state of Virginia.

History
The Robinson River is mis-marked as the Robertson River on the famous Boye, Bucholtz, Tanner map.  However, the Robinson River is referenced in earlier documents, such as those in the Germanna historical archives.

See also
List of Virginia rivers

References

External links
Virginia Whitewater - the Robinson River in Madison County
Boyes/Bucholtz/Tanner Map of Virginia 1825/1856

Rivers of Virginia
Rivers of Madison County, Virginia
Tributaries of the Rappahannock River